= Owen John =

Welsh author

- Born: Leonard Owen-John; 1 May 1918; Wales
- Died: 23 January 1995 (aged 76); Swansea, Wales
- Other names: John Bourne
- Occupation: Writer
- Years active: 1966-1979
- Known for: Haggai Godin series

Leonard Owen-John (1 May 1918 – 23 January 1995) was a Welsh author of spy fiction who is mostly remembered for his series of novels starring the Russian-born MI-6 agent Haggai Godin.

Praised by his comparatively realistic approach to the world of espionage, he has been called by critics "a master of the double cross".

== Bibliography ==
=== Haggai Godin series ===
These novels star Haggai Godin, a hard-boiled, bon vivant MI-6 agent of Russian ancestry, who is frequently paired with Colonel Charles Mason of the CIA. Each novel is set in a different country.

- Thirty Days Hath September (1966)
- The Disinformer (1966)
- A Beam of Black Light (1968)
- Dead on Time (1969)
- The Shadow in the Sea (1972)
- Sabotage (1973)
- Getaway (1976)

=== Other works ===
- Computer Takes All (1967, as John Bourne)
- The Diamond Dress (1970)
- The Controller (1978)
- Festival (1978)
- McGreogor's Island (1979)
